Neil Labatte (born April 24, 1957) is a former professional ice hockey player.

Labatte played 26 games in the National Hockey League for the St. Louis Blues and also played for the Salt Lake Golden Eagles of the Central Hockey League.  

Labatte was born in Don Mills, Ontario, Canada.

Education
Labatte majored in mathematics from 1974 through 1976 at Brown University and played with Brown University's hockey team in 1976. He studied at the University of Utah from 1983 to 1989, receiving bachelor's and master's degrees in finance.

Labatte is also a graduate of the ICD-Rotman Directors Education Program of the Institute of Corporate Directors and University of Toronto's Rotman School of Management.

Hockey career
As a youth, Labatte played in the 1970 Quebec International Pee-Wee Hockey Tournament with a minor ice hockey team from Don Mills.

Labatte was drafted 27th overall by the St. Louis Blues in the 1977 NHL amateur draft and 33rd overall by the Edmonton Oilers in the 1977 WHA Amateur Draft. He played in 26 regular season games in the NHL with St. Louis, scoring two assists. He also played in the Central Hockey League for the Salt Lake Golden Eagles. He retired in 1982 and enrolled to the University of Utah.

Business career
Labatte has been in the real estate industry for over 35 years and is the founder of Global Dimension Capital, Inc., a hotel and real estate advisor formed in 2007 for the purpose of investing capital in hotel and real estate acquisitions and developments. 

Labatte also became co-chairman of the NHL Alumni Association alongside Glenn Healy.

References

External links

1957 births
Living people
Brown Bears men's ice hockey players
Canadian ice hockey defencemen
Edmonton Oilers (WHA) draft picks
St. Louis Blues draft picks
St. Louis Blues players
Salt Lake Golden Eagles (CHL) players
Sportspeople from North York
Ice hockey people from Toronto
Toronto Marlboros players